Celia may refer to:

General
Celia (given name)
Celia, a subgenus of carabid beetles of the genus Amara
Celia, the last natural-born Pyrenean Ibex
 Celia (virtual assistant), AI virtual assistant by Huawei
, a number of ships with this name
Hurricane Celia (disambiguation)

Literature
Celia (As You Like It), a character in Shakespeare's As You Like It
Celia, the title character in the novels by Elena Fortún:
Celia, lo que dice (1929)
Celia en el colegio (1932)
Celia novelista (1934)
Celia en el mundo (1934)
Celia y sus amigos (1935)
Celia madrecita (1939)

Movies and television
Celia (1949 film), British comedy thriller
Celia (1989 film), Australian drama
Celia (Colombian TV series), a Spanish-language telenovela based on the life of Celia Cruz
Celia (Spanish TV series), a Spanish TV-series based on Elena Fortún's novels
Celia Mae, Mike Wazowski's girlfriend in the film Monsters, Inc.

Music
Celia (album), an album by Tiwa Savage
Celia, tribute album by Angélique Kidjo 2019
"Celia" (song), a 2011 single by Annah Mac
"Celia", a song by Phil Ochs on his 1964 album All the News That's Fit to Sing
 "Celia", B-side of the 1974 single "Billy Don't Be a Hero" by Paper Lace

Sports
 Celia Jiménez (footballer), Spanish footballer commonly known as Celia